Women in Ukraine have equal constitutional rights as men in the economic, political, cultural, and social fields, as well as in the family.

Most of the around 45 percent of Ukraine's population (45 million) who suffer violence – physical, sexual, or mental – are women.

History of feminism in Ukraine 
The history of Ukraine during the past two centuries is closely connected to that of the Russian Empire and later on the Soviet Union. Ukraine became independence in 1991 and is now a state with more than 40 million inhabitants, most of whom are Christian Orthodox, and 70% of the population is urban.

One of the biggest feminist organization in Europe was founded during the 1920s in modern western Ukraine or Galicia. The organization was called the Ukrainian Women's Union and was led by Milena Rudnytska. During the Soviet-era, feminism was classified as a bourgeois ideology, hence counterrevolutionary and anti-Soviet. Civil society and feminism were virtually nonexistent in the Soviet times. After Ukraine gained independence in 1991, a feminist movement began taking root.</ref>

, there are several women's rights groups active in Ukraine, including Feminist Ofenzyva and Ukrainian Woman's Union. FEMEN, the most active women's rights group in Kyiv, was officially closed in 2013. The organization left Ukraine because the leadership feared "for their lives and freedom".

During the War in Donbas that started in 2014, a "huge volunteer movement of women organizing humanitarian action and community dialogue" developed, according to Oksana Potapova, a feminist and peacebuilding researcher and activist who created Theatre for Dialogue, a non-governmental organization in support of the women's volunteer movement.

Violence against women 

Around 45 percent of Ukraine's population (45 million) suffer violence – physical, sexual, or mental – and most of them are women. Street women are the most vulnerable category; around 40 percent of them suffer from sexual violence, with 25 percent being under 18. In 2001, Ukraine enacted the Domestic Violence (Prevention) Act 2001. Article 173-2 of the Code of Administrative Offences of Ukraine also deals with "violence over family". Nuzhat Ehsan, the UN Population Fund representative in Ukraine, stated in February 2013 “Ukraine really has an unacceptable level of violence, mainly by men and mainly due to high level of alcohol consumption”. He also blamed loopholes in the legislation for contributing to the problem of domestic violence, “You can violate women and still if you are a high-level official or from a high-level official family, you can get away with it”.

Women in the labor force 

Women make up 54% of the population of Ukraine and 47.4% of its labor force. Over 60% of all Ukrainian women have higher education (college level and above). However, the unemployment rate of women is very high compared to men with the same educational background (80% of all unemployed in Ukraine are women), not to mention the extensive hidden unemployment among women.

Labor laws establish the legal equality of men and women, including equal pay for equal work, a principle that generally was observed. However, industries dominated by female workers had the lowest relative wages and were the ones most likely to be affected by wage arrears. The retirement age is in the process of being gradually increased, to 60 years for women and 62 years for men-civil servants by 2021 (the original age was 55 for women and 60 for men). There were reports of some employers refusing to hire younger women likely to become pregnant or women over 35. Women also received lower salaries and had limited opportunity for career advancement. Few women held top managerial positions in the government or in state- owned or private industry.

Women in Ukrainian business 
On average women earn 30% less than men occupying similar posts.

About 50% of all enterprises without employees are woman owned. Enterprises with 1 to 5 employees are 27% woman owned. Enterprises with less than 50 employees are 30% woman owned. These numbers are similar to those in other Western economies. Women tend to lead small business in retail, wholesale trade and catering. 2% of large companies are headed by women.

In 2008, the women's labour participation rate (LPR) was approximately 62%.

Women in Ukrainian politics 
In the 2019 Ukrainian parliamentary election 87 women were elected to parliament, a record for Ukraine, 20.52% of the total number of deputies. In the election about 50% of elected Voice deputies were women, 37% of the elected European Solidarity MP's were women; the least places for women was in Opposition Platform – For Life with 11.4%. In 2014, about 12.1% the Verkhovna Rada (the Ukrainian parliament) were women. From the 2014 parliamentary election to the 2019 election this number increased to 53, that is, 12.6%. The percentage of female lawmakers fluctuates per election. Of the 47 women elected in 2014 to parliament only 2 achieved this by winning a constituency (the election used a mixed electoral system with 53.2% MP's elected under party lists and 46.8% in 198 constituencies). In 2019 26 women won a constituency seat. In the parliament elected in the 2012 Ukrainian parliamentary election women made up 9.9% of the parliament. In the first parliamentary election held after 1991's Ukrainian independence held in 1994 only 11 women (2.3% of the parliament) were elected. An Ukrayinska Pravda research published on 12 November 2014 revealed that globally on average 22% of parliament consists of women, while in European Union countries this figure is 25%. According to a study (published on 1 November 2014) by Inter-Parliamentary Union Ukraine is ranked 112th among 189 countries in terms of political representation of women in parliament. Laws to re-implement Soviet-era quota for women in parliament (30% or 35%) have been debated in parliament but not approved.

Bloc Yulia Tymoshenko and its successor Batkivshchyna have been the only woman-led party to make it into parliament. Hanna Hopko was first on the party list of Self Reliance, which finished third in the October 2014 Ukrainian parliamentary election. In the same election Nadiya Savchenko was placed first on the party list of Batkivshchyna (the party finished sixth in the election). There have been more woman-led parties in Ukraine and even a few "woman issue" parties (analyst's have described these as "virtual parties designed to steal votes from opposition parties").

The second Yatsenyuk Government (appointed 2 December 2014) had two female ministers. Its predecessor first Yatsenyuk Government (appointed 27 February 2014) had one female minister. The 2016–2019 Groysman government ended his tenure with five female members.

So far the only government that had no female ministers (and was Europe's only government that had no female members in its composition at the time) was the 11 March 2010 appointed first Azarov Government until Raisa Bohatyryova was appointed Minister of Healthcare and Vice Prime Minister of Ukraine on 14 February 2012. Prime Minister Mykola Azarov stated in March 2010 there were no female ministers in this government because "Reforms do not fall into women's competence", while adding that he greatly respects women. Women's groups in Ukraine reported Azarov to the country's ombudsman following this remarks. They accuse him of gender discrimination and holding neanderthal views and did file different Court cases against him. Azorov's consecutive second Azarov Government (that lasted from 24 December 2012 until 27 February 2014) had three female ministers.

During the presidential election of 2010, then candidate Viktor Yanukovych refused to debate his female opponent prime minister Yulia Tymoshenko and justified it by saying that "a woman's place is in the kitchen". (Former) Verkhovna Rada Chairman Volodymyr Lytvyn have also made comments that could be seen as insolent towards woman.

A bill banning abortion (written by Andriy Shkil) was registered in the Verkhovna Rada at the request of the clergy of the Greek Catholic Church and the Vatican on 12 March 2012.

Women in the Ukrainian military 

Women in Ukraine are allowed to join the military, but historically this has been limited to non-combatant roles: medic, cook, accountant, etc. As of July 2016, Ukrainian military forces began allowing women to participate in combatant roles including, but not limited to, machine gunner, military scout, and sniper.

See also 
 Women in the military by country#Ukraine

References

Further reading

External links 

 
 
Ukraine